Mike Needle is an English songwriter, producer and singer.

He has co-written songs for artists such as One Direction, Rita Ora, Tom Grennan, Niall Horan, Rag'n'Bone Man, Alan Walker, James TW & JP Cooper, and has vocal-produced for artists such as Ella Henderson, One Direction, Christina Perri & Westlife.

Notable songs written by Needle include "This Town" by Niall Horan, "Skin" by Rag'n'Bone Man, "Tired" by Alan Walker, and "Little Bit of Love" by Tom Grennan.

Needle's composition "Little Bit of Love" by Tom Grennan received a nomination for Song Of The Year at the 2022 Brit Awards.

Needle’s songwriting debut 'What a Feeling" from One Direction’s album 'Made in the A.M.' topped Rolling Stone's Readers' Poll as the best track One Direction ever released.

Needle has contributed to four Top10 Albums in the US & UK, and three Top10 Singles. Human by Rag'n'Bone Man, Evering Road by Tom Grennan, and Flicker by Niall Horan all achieved No.1 in the US/UK.

In 2022, Needle was nominated for an Ivor Novello Award for his composition "Little Bit of Love".

Songwriting Discography 
As per Tidal Credits

Awards and nominations 

Ivor Novello Award

|-
|style="text-align:center;"| 2022 ||style="text-align:left;"|Little Bit Of Love
|| PRS For Music Award ||

References 

English songwriters
English record producers
1986 births
Living people